Hans Preiskeit (26 September 1920 – 26 June 1972) was a German racing cyclist. He won the German National Road Race in 1955.

References

External links
 

1920 births
1972 deaths
German male cyclists
Sportspeople from Wrocław
German cycling road race champions
People from the Province of Lower Silesia
20th-century German people